L'Hospitalet de Llobregat (often shortened to L'Hospitalet or just L'H, is a municipality of Spain, located to the immediate southwest of Barcelona, in the autonomous community of Catalonia. It is part of the Barcelona Metropolitan Area.

By population, it is the second largest in Catalonia and the sixteenth in Spain. It is one of the most densely populated cities in the European Union.

Name 
The name of L'Hospitalet (literally, 'the small hospital' in Catalan) makes reference to a hostel. The name of the river Llobregat is added as an accompaniment.

History 
The first records of the settlement date to the Neolithic era with artefacts showing human habitation in the Llobregat river area. Roman artefacts have been found dating to the 2nd century BC such as a funeral decoration representing the head of Medusa, now in the Archaeological Museum of Catalonia. However it is not until the 10th century that written references to Provençana (the city's original name) appear.

The place had about 5,000 inhabitants by the turn of the 20th century. Throughout the early 20th century, it consisted of three different urban settlements, Centre, Sta. Eulàlia and Collblanc. Local agricultural output and profitability experienced a peak in this period. A chunk of the municipality (900 ha) was lost to the municipality of Barcelona in 1920. L'Hospitalet then became a primarily industrial municipality, focused on textile, metalworking, ceramic and building materials industries.

The 1960s and 1970s saw a second population boom, caused by immigration from poorer regions of Spain: however this was not matched by construction of the necessary amenities and it was only in the 1990s that public investment resulted in additional schools, leisure facilities and housing.

Demographics

As of 2020, the registered population stands at 274,320, of which 126,237 were born in Catalonia, 54,098 were born in other Spanish regions, 93,984 were born abroad and 1 person was born in former Spanish territories.

As of 2020, the foreign population amounts for 67,213 people. The largest groups of foreign citizens are listed as follows:

Geography
The area on which the city is constructed may be divided in two different geological areas. 
One of them follows the coast typology and is called La Marina, similarly to two coast areas of neighbouring Barcelona's Zona Franca: La Marina del Prat Vermell and La Marina de Port. The latter half of L'Hospitalet is called El Samontà, which consists of hills and a more elevated area.

Economy

The city's reputation is largely still that of a depressed suburb, drawing on its proletarian origins and its reliance on Barcelona. But its economy has improved recently, as can be seen from the city's new skyline and relocation of companies to the city's new financial centre. Urban regeneration and construction took place during the 2000s, as well as ongoing work on improving public transportation in the second municipality of the Barcelona metropolitan area. The former airline Spanair's headquarters were in L'Hospitalet. Former mayor Celestino Corbacho campaigned to improve the city's infrastructure from his position in the Ministry of Work.

Skyscrapers

 Hotel Porta Fira (2010) – 113 meters – Completed
 Torre Realia BCN (2009) – 112 meters – Completed
 Hotel Catalonia Plaza Europa (2011) – 105 meters – Completed
 Hesperia Tower (2006) – 106 meters – Completed
 Tower Caixa Catalunya (?) – 106 meters – Planned
 Torre Inbisa (2010) – 104 meters – Completed
 Torre Zenit (2009) – 104 meters – Completed
 Hospital de Bellvitge (1972) – 82 meters – Completed
 Tower Colonial (?) – 75 meters – Under Construction (on hold)
 Tower Fadesa I (2009) – 65 meters – Completed
 Tower Fadesa II (2009) – 65 meters – Completed
 Tower Fadesa III (2009) – 65 meters – Completed
 City Judicial Building A (2008) – 62 meters – Completed
 City Judicial Building C (2008) – 58 meters- Completed
 Torre Melina (Hotel Rey Juan Carlos) (1992) – 60 meters -Completed

Administrative units

District I
El Centre

El Centre is the historical centre of the city, the oldest neighbourhood, where the City Council is, as well as the centre of activities such as La Farga and many of the cultural buildings, such as the History Museum, the Can Sumarro library, the cultural centre Barradas or the Sala Alexandre Cirici. It borders the district of Sanfeliu and Can Serra to the north, Bellvitge to the south, Sant Josep to the east, and the city of Cornellà de Llobregat to the west.

Sant Josep
Sant Josep remains framed by the square that is formed by the avenue of the Fabregada and that of Isabella The Catholic (Isabel la Catòlica) to the west, the Torrent Gornal to the east, the railroad on the north side Carrilet to the south. In this area, all the industrial activities that Hospitalet had through the ages left their mark: from the flour mills and the distilleries, up to the different energetic exploitation of the waterfalls of the Canal de la Infanta or the ceramic, textile, metallurgical and chemical industries. In fact, Sant Josep was originally an industrial suburb, but the subsequent disappearance of many factories, as well as the population increase, have given it a residential character.

Sanfeliu
Civic life in this quarter centres on the avenue of the Cirerers and the Communities Square (Plaça de les Comunitats). This public space is the scene of the greatest holiday celebrations, such as the festival of Sant Joan, the Carnival, and many other popular events. The cultural centre is also at the heart of many of the activities.

District II
Collblanc
This ward has a marked commercial character, centred near the Collblanc Metro stop. The Market Square (Plaça del Mercat) and the surroundings are the main centre of cultural life.

La Torrassa
Its origins has been linked to Collblanc. Today, the Spanish Square (Plaça Espanyola) and the new park of La Torrassa are at the heart of this neighbourhood and is where the holiday celebrations at the beginning of every summer are largest.

District III
Santa Eulàlia

Its origins are dated back to Medieval times thanks to the presence of the Santa Eulàlia de Provençana hermitage (dated in the 12th century thanks to an inscription in the façade). Also it was very important during the Industrial Revolution thanks to the presence of many industries in the quarter, such as Can Trinxet, L'Aprestadora or Can Pareto.
Gran Via Sud
It is the smallest quarter in the town.

District IV
La Florida
Les Planes

District V
Pubilla Casas
Can Serra

District VI

Bellvitge
In 1964 the Inmobiliaria Ciudad Condal S.A. (ICC) company initiated the construction of this neighbourhood as it stands nowadays, beside the hermitage, on land which had been bought from local farmers. It was designed as a residential area to house the large number of immigrants who came to Catalonia from elsewhere in Spain – more than 126,000 people in 1964 – in search of work.

Gornal

District VII
Granvia l'Hospitalet

Transport

International relations

Twin towns and sister cities
L'Hospitalet is twinned with the following cities:

Bayonne, France
Tuzla, Bosnia and Herzegovina

See also

Metropolitan area of Barcelona
Zona Franca (Barcelona)

Notes

References

External links

 
 Artistic and historical buildings in L'Hospitalet de Llobregat
 Government data pages 

 
Populated places in Barcelonès